The Senate Standing Committee on Rules, Procedures and the Rights of Parliament (RPRD) is a committee of the Senate of Canada.  As a standing committee, the rules of the Senate re-establish the committee at the opening of every new session of the Senate (otherwise the committee would permanently dissolve).  The committee is charged with considering the possible repercussions and consequences of the motion of Hugh Segal to televise the proceedings of the Senate for public viewing.

Mandate 
The committee's mandate is: 
 on its own initiative to propose, from time to time, amendments to the rules for consideration by the Senate; 
 upon reference from the Senate, to examine and, if required, report on any question of privilege; and 
 to consider the orders and customs of the Senate and privileges of Parliament.

Members 

The Representative of the Government in the Senate and Leader of the Opposition in the Senate are both ex-officio members of the committee.

Notes 

Committees of the Senate of Canada